Zoophobias